Rink "Rien" van der Velde (born 21 February 1957) is a Dutch politician. He was a member of the House of Representatives of the Netherlands for the Labour Party between 25 October 2016 and 23 March 2017. He entered the House as a temporary replacement of Sjoera Dikkers. On 14 December 2016 he became a permanent member of the House when he took the place of the resigned parliamentary group leader Diederik Samsom. He has served in the municipal council of Noordoostpolder since 2010. He serves as council leader of the combination Labour Party/GreenLeft.

Van der Velde is a lecturer at Van Hall Larenstein since September 2006. He also owns an education institute.

Van der Velde was number 51 on the Labour Party list for the 2012 Dutch general election.

References

External links
  Parlement.com biography

1957 births
Living people
Labour Party (Netherlands) politicians
Members of the House of Representatives (Netherlands)
Municipal councillors in Flevoland
People from Noordoostpolder
21st-century Dutch politicians